Downtown Wabash Historic District, also known as the Wabash Marketplace District, is a national historic district located at Wabash, Wabash County, Indiana. It encompasses 27 contributing buildings in the central business district of Wabash.  It developed between about 1840 and 1920, and includes representative examples of Italianate, Romanesque Revival, and Second Empire style architecture.  Located in the district are the separately listed James M. Amoss Building and Solomon Wilson Building.  Other notable buildings include the E.M. Conner Building (1897), Back Saddlery and Harness Shop (1845), Wabash Loan and Trust Company (1927), Bradley Block (1901), Busick Block (1882), Eagles Building (1906), the Plain Dealer Building (1897), S.J. Payne Block (1898), J.C. Penney's (1920), National Block (1876), Sheriff's House and Jail (1879), Memorial Hall (1899), U.S. Post Office (1911-1912), Wabash County Courthouse (1878), Shively Block (1897), and Wabash City Hall (1883-1884).

It was listed on the National Register of Historic Places in 1986.

References

Historic districts on the National Register of Historic Places in Indiana
Italianate architecture in Indiana
Romanesque Revival architecture in Indiana
Second Empire architecture in Indiana
Historic districts in Wabash, Indiana
National Register of Historic Places in Wabash County, Indiana